Hans Eberle is a German sprint canoeist who competed in the late 1930s . He won two medals at the 1938 ICF Canoe Sprint World Championships in Vaxholm with a gold in the K-2 1000 m and a silver in the K-2 10000 m events.

References

German male canoeists
Possibly living people
Year of birth missing
ICF Canoe Sprint World Championships medalists in kayak